The Summer 2016 Sulu and Basilan clashes were armed conflicts that took place in two battlefronts on the southern islands of Mindanao, Philippines from 21 June to 12 July.

Background 
After Canadian hostage John Ridsdel had been beheaded by Abu Sayyaf group (ASG) in late April 2016, Canadian hostage Robert Hall was beheaded on June 13, 2016. ASG even demanded $13 million ransom for the release of two other hostages.

Philippine President Duterte warned ASG to stop kidnapping, saying he would eventually confront them.

On 17 June, about five thousand Philippine soldiers had been deployed to the target areas in Sulu to track down ASG.

Clashes

Sulu
On 21 June, soldiers from the 32nd Infantry Battalion encountered about two hundred ASG members in Patikul town. Three ASG members were killed and at least 10 were wounded. Sixteen Army soldiers were wounded.

On 22 June, another firefight left at least seven ASG members killed and eighteen soldiers wounded.

As the hostage tracking operation continued, on 7 July, troops encountered suspected ASG members. One soldier was killed with six wounded. Nine ASG members were killed and at least nineteen militants were wounded.

By 11 July, 22 ASG  were dead.

Basilan 
On 6 July, suspected ASG bandits led by Furuji Indama and Isnilon Hapilon stormed a village in Tipo-Tipo, Basilan. The attack targeted the headquarters of the 18th Infantry Battalion. ASG occupied and fortified  Hill 490 of Ungkaya Pukan town as a staging point.

On 12 July, Army rangers prepared to assault Hill 490 after an air and artillery barrage. One ranger was killed and five others were injured after one of them tripped an improvised explosive device. The government casualties were immediately airlifted to Camp Navarro General Hospital.

At least eighteen militants were killed with nine wounded.

References 

2016 crimes in the Philippines
Sulu and Basilan clashes
June 2016 events in the Philippines
July 2016 events in the Philippines
Terrorist incidents in the Philippines in 2016
History of Sulu
History of Basilan